Jill Peak is a British dog breeder and Crufts dog show judge. She was born in Southport. She founded Bayard Beagles, who breed beagles.

References

Living people
Year of birth missing (living people)
Dog breeders
Crufts